State Road 780 (SR 780), known as Fruitville Road, is a  east–west street in Sarasota, Florida.  The western terminus is an intersection with US 301/SR 683 (Washington Boulevard). The eastern terminus is east of an interchange with Interstate 75 (SR 93) in Fruitville, where the road continues east as County Road 780 (CR 780). West of US 301, Fruitville Road extends  to the west of the end of SR 780, ending at an intersection with the Tamiami Trail (US 41/SR 45) in downtown Sarasota.

Route description
SR 780 begins at an intersection with US 301/SR 683 in Sarasota, heading east on Fruitville Road, a four-lane divided highway, continuing onto County Road 780. West of US 301, Fruitville Road continues as an unnumbered four-lane divided highway to an intersection with US 41/SR 45 in downtown Sarasota. 
From the western terminus, SR 780 heads through residential areas with some businesses, widening to six lanes and curving southeast before heading east again, intersecting School Avenue. The state road crosses a Seminole Gulf Railway line and intersects North Lime Avenue. The road continues east through more residential and commercial areas, intersecting North Tuttle Avenue, North Lockwood Ridge Road, and CR 773 (Beneva Road). SR 780 leaves Sarasota for Fruitville and passes through more developed areas, intersecting McIntosh Road, Honore Avenue, and Cattlemen Road before coming to an interchange with I-75/SR 93. Past this interchange, SR 780 comes to its eastern terminus, with Fruitville Road continuing east as CR 780.

History
Historically, SR 780 continued eastward on Fruitville Road past the current terminus, through Fordville, before zigzagging through Old Myakka before becoming Clay Gully Road at the northern boundary of Myakka River State Park. The part of former SR 780 east of I-75 became County Road 780 in the early 1980s, after Florida Department of Transportation designated it a secondary State Road (and applied an "S-" prefix to the State Road 780 designation a decade earlier). This was part of a large set of redesignations that transformed the map of the State of Florida.

Major intersections

References

780
780
Sarasota, Florida